Saul "Sonny" Berman (April 21, 1925 – January 16, 1947) was an American jazz trumpeter.

Berman was born in New Haven, Connecticut, United States.  He began touring at age sixteen and performed with Louis Prima, Harry James and Benny Goodman, but is best known for his later work with Woody Herman. Berman was distinguished by his passionate and innovative soloing, and his versatility of tone—ranging from bold and emotional to sweetly muted.  He was also known for his sense of humor, which often made its way into a playfulness and joyfulness found in his solo work.

Sonny Berman died at the age of 21 in New York City of heart failure, caused by a drug overdose.

Discography
 Sidewalks of Cuba (with Woody Herman), 1946
 Curbstone Scuffle, 1947
 Woodchopper's Holiday, 1946
 Jazz Immortal 1946, released 1954 [Esoteric ES-532]
With Georgie Auld
Rainbow Mist (Delmark, 1944 [1992]) compilation of Apollo recordings

References

External links
The Incomplete Sonny Berman

1925 births
1947 deaths
20th-century American musicians
20th-century trumpeters
Bebop trumpeters
Musicians from New Haven, Connecticut
American jazz trumpeters
American male trumpeters
Jazz musicians from Connecticut
20th-century American male musicians
American male jazz musicians